Adam Hafejee Patel, Baron Patel of Blackburn (7 June 1940 – 29 May 2019) was a British businessman and Labour Member of the House of Lords.

Biography
Son of Hafejee Ismail Patel and wife Aman (née Zumla) Hafejee, he was educated at The Pioneer High School, Bharuch, in the modern-day Indian state of Gujarat, and the Maharaja Sayajirao University of Baroda, where he graduated with a Bachelor of Commerce.

The retired managing director of a clothing manufacturing company, he was Director of the East Lancashire Training Enterprise Council, and Enterprise plc. He also served as President of Lancashire Council of Mosques, Vice-President of the Blackburn Community Relations Council, counsellor to the Muslim Council of Britain and 
chairman of the British Hajj Commission.

On 14 February 2000, he was created a Life Peer as Baron Patel of Blackburn, of Langho in the County of Lancashire. Patel was an Honorary Fellow of the Bolton Institute as well as of the University of Central Lancashire.

Lord Patel became an Honorary Patron of the leading Blackburn Rovers supporters group, The BRFC Action Group, in May 2012.

Patel was married since 1964. He had four sons and four daughters.

Patel died on 29 May 2019 at the age of 78.

References

General references
 

1940 births
2019 deaths
Patel of Blackburn
People associated with the University of Bolton
People associated with the University of Central Lancashire
Indian emigrants to England
Maharaja Sayajirao University of Baroda alumni
British politicians of Indian descent
20th-century British businesspeople
Life peers created by Elizabeth II